Suleyman Atayev (born 1996) is a Turkmenistani swimmer. He competed in the 50 m freestyle and 200 m freestyle events at the 2013 World Aquatics Championships.

References

Living people
1996 births
Turkmenistan male swimmers
Date of birth missing (living people)